The 1937 New York Giants season was the franchise's 55th season. The Giants won the National League pennant. The team went on to lose to the New York Yankees in the 1937 World Series, four games to one.

Offseason
 January 6, 1937: Tommy Thevenow was purchased by the Giants from the Cincinnati Reds.
 January 25, 1937: Ed Madjeski was purchased by the Giants from the New York Yankees.

Regular season

Season standings

Record vs. opponents

Notable transactions
 May 1, 1937: Tommy Thevenow was traded by the Giants to the Boston Bees for Billy Urbanski.

Roster

Player stats

Batting

Starters by position
Note: Pos = Position; G = Games played; AB = At bats; H = Hits; Avg. = Batting average; HR = Home runs; RBI = Runs batted in

Other batters
Note: G = Games played; AB = At bats; H = Hits; Avg. = Batting average; HR = Home runs; RBI = Runs batted in

Pitching

Starting pitchers
Note: G = Games pitched; GS = Games started; IP = Innings pitched; W = Wins; L = Losses; ERA = Earned run average; SO = Strikeouts

Other pitchers
Note: G = Games pitched; IP = Innings pitched; W = Wins; L = Losses; ERA = Earned run average; SO = Strikeouts

Relief pitchers
Note: G = Games pitched; W = Wins; L = Losses; SV = Saves; ERA = Earned run average; SO = Strikeouts

1937 World Series

Game 1
October 6, 1937, at Yankee Stadium in New York City

Game 2
October 7, 1937, at Yankee Stadium in New York City

Game 3
October 8, 1937, at the Polo Grounds in New York City

Game 4
October 9, 1937, at the Polo Grounds in New York City

Game 5
October 10, 1937, at the Polo Grounds in New York City

Farm system

LEAGUE CHAMPIONS: Blytheville

Notes

References
 1937 New York Giants team page at Baseball Reference
 1937 New York Giants team page at Baseball Almanac

New York Giants (NL)
San Francisco Giants seasons
New York Giants season
National League champion seasons
New York
1930s in Manhattan
Washington Heights, Manhattan